Hysiae or Hysiai or Hysia (Ὑσία) may refer to:

 Hysia (Arcadia), a town of ancient Arcadia, Greece
 Hysiae (Argolis), a garrison town in Greece southwest of Argos, where two battle were fought:
 Battle of Hysiae (c.669 BC) 
 Battle of Hysiae (417 BC)
 Hysiae (Boeotia), a village in Boeotia, was not far from Plataea and is mentioned by Thucydides
 Hysia (beetle), a genus of ladybird in family Coccinellidae